This is a list of significant books in the doctrines of Sunni Islam. A classical example of an index of Islamic books can be found in Kitāb al-Fihrist of Ibn Al-Nadim.

The Qur'an and its translations (in English)
 The Meaning of the Glorious Koran by Marmaduke Pickthall
 The Holy Qur'an: Text, Translation and Commentary by Abdullah Yusuf Ali
 The Qur'an: A New Translation by Muhammad A. S. Abdel Haleem
 The Clear Quran: A Thematic English Translation by Dr. Mustafa Khattab
 The Holy Qur'án (The treasure of faith) by Professor Shah Faridul Haque
 Bridges' Translation of the Ten Qira'at of the Noble Qur'an by Fadel Soliman

Hadith

Six Canonical Books of Hadith Collection
 Sahih Bukhari of Muhammad al-Bukhari (d. 870 A.D. / 256 AH)
 Sahih Muslim of Muslim ibn al-Hajjaj (d. 875 A.D. / 261 AH)
 Sunan Ibn Majah of Ibn Majah (d. 887 A.D. / 273 AH)
 Sunan Abu Dawud of Abu Dawood (d. 889 A.D. / 275 AH)
 Jami` at-Tirmidhi of Al-Tirmidhi (d. 892 A.D. / 279 AH)
 Al-Sunan al-Sughra of Al-Nasa'i (d. 915 A.D. / 303 AH)

Primary Sources of Hadith Collections (Original Collections)
 Al-Fiqh al-Akbar of Imam Abu Hanifa (d. 767 A.D.)
 Al-Muwatta of Imam Malik ibn Anas (d. 795 A.D.)
 Musnad of Imam Shafi‘i (d. 820 A.D.)
 Musannaf of ‘Abd ar-Razzaq as-San‘ani (d. 826 A.D.)
 Musannaf of Ibn Abi Shaybah (d. 849 A.D.)
 Musnad of Ishaq Ibn Rahwayh (d. 853 A.D.)
 Musnad of Imam Ahmad ibn Hanbal (d. 855 A.D.) (Sahifah Ibn Munabbih of Hammam ibn Munabbih (d. 719 A.D.) is included in it)
 Sunan of al-Darimi (d. 869 A.D.)
 Al-Adab al-Mufrad of Muhammad al-Bukhari (d. 870 A.D.)
 Musnad of Abu Bakr Ahmad al-Bazzar (d. 905 A.D.)
 Musnad of Abu Ya'la al-Mawsili (d. 919 A.D.)
 Tahdhib al-Athar of Muhammad ibn Jarir al-Tabari (d. 923 A.D.)
 Sahih of Ibn Khuzaymah (d. 924 A.D.)
 Sahih of Ibn Hibban (d. 965 A.D.)
 Al-Mu'jam al-Kabeer by al-Tabarani (d. 970 A.D.)
 Sunan of Al-Daraqutni (d. 995 A.D.)
 Al-Mustadrak ala al-Sahihayn of Al-Hakim al-Nishapuri (d. 1002 A.D)
 Shuab ul Iman of Al-Bayhaqi (d. 1066 A.D.)
 Sunan al-Kubra of Al-Bayhaqi (d. 1066 A.D.)
 Sunan al-Wusta of Al-Bayhaqi (d. 1066 A.D.)

Secondary Hadith Collections (Compilations made from Original Collections)
 Musnad al-Firdous of Abu Mansur Al-Dailami (d. 1162 A.D.) (An improved version of Firdous al-Akhbar of Abu Shuja` Shiruyah Al-Dailami (d. 1115 A.D.))
 At-Targhib wat-Tarhib of Al-Munzhiri (d. 1258 A.D.)
 Riyadh as-Saaliheen of Imam al-Nawawi (d. 1277 A.D.)
 Mishkat al-Masabih by Khatib Al-Tabrizi (d. 1340 A.D.) (An improved version of Masabih al-Sunnah of Al-Baghawi (d. 1122 A.D.))
 Talkhis al-Mustadrak by al-Dhahabi (d. 1348 A.D.) (An abridged version of Al-Mustadrak alaa al-Sahihain of Hakim al-Nishaburi (d. 1014 A.D.))
 Majma al-Zawa'id by Ali ibn Abu Bakr al-Haythami (d. 1404 A.D.)
 Bulugh al-Maram by Ibn Hajar Asqalani (d. 1448 A.D.)
 Jami’ Jawami’ by Al-Suyuti 
 Kanz al-Ummal by Ali ibn Abd-al-Malik al-Hindi (d. 1567 A.D.)

Commentaries (Sharh) & Revision of Hadith Collections
 Sharh Sunan Abi Dawood by Al-Khattabi
 Aridat al-Ahwadhi bi-Sharh Sahih al-Tirmidhi by Abu Bakr ibn al-Arabi
 Kitab al-Qabas fi Sharh Muwatta Malik  by Abu Bakr ibn al-Arabi
 al-Ishraf of Awn ad-Din ibn Hubayra
 Al Minhaj bi Sharh Sahih Muslim of Al-Nawawi
  Commentary on Al-Nawawi's Forty Hadith by Ibn Daqiq al-'Id
 Jami al-Masanid Wa al-Sunan by Ibn Kathir
 Jami al-Ulum wal-Hikam of Ibn Rajab
 Fath al-Bari of Ibn Hajar Asqalani
 Umdat al-Qari of Badr al-Din al-Ayni
 Irshad al-Sari of al-Qastallani
 Mirqat al-Mafatih Sharh Mishkat al-masabih by Ali al-Qari
 Sharh Sunan An-Nasaai of Al-Suyuti and As-Sindi
 Annotations Sunan Abi Dawood of Al-Suyuti
 Silsalat al-Hadith ad-Da'ifah by Muhammad Nasiruddin al-Albani

Collections of Fabricated Narrations
 Al-Mawduʿat al-Kubra by Ibn al-Jawzi

Hadith studies & Terminologies 
 Some of the works of al-Madini
 Tawil Mukhtalif al-Hadith by Ibn Qutaybah
 Gharib al-Hadith by Al-Khattabi
 al-Kifaya fi ma'rifat usul 'ilm al-riwaya by Al-Khatib al-Baghdadi
 al-Ilma ila Maʿrifa Usul al-Riwaya wa Taqyid al-Samaʿ by Qadi Ayyad
 Muqaddimah fi Ulum al-Ḥadith by Ibn al-Salah
 Al-Muqizah fi 'Ilm Mustalah al-Hadith by Al-Dhahabi
 Alfiyatu Iraaqee by Zain al-Din al-'Iraqi
 Muqaddimah al-Badr al-Munir by Ibn al-Mulaqqin
 Nukhbat al-Fikar by Ibn Hajar al-Asqalani
 Al-Maqasid al-Hasanah by Al-Sakhawi
 Alfiyyah al-Hadit by Al-Suyuti
 Tadrib al-Rawi by Al-Suyuti

Tafsir (Exegesis of the Qur'an)

Authentic Classical Tafsir 
 Tafsir al-Tabari by Al-Tabari
 Tafsir al-Maturidi by Abu Mansur al-Maturidi
 Tafsir al-Thalabi by Al-Tha'labi
 Kashf al-Asrār wa ʿUddat al-Abrār by Rashīd al-Dīn Maybudī
 Tafsir al-Baghawi by Al-Baghawi
 Ahkam al-Qur'an by Abu Bakr ibn al-Arabi
 Al-Muharrar al-Wajiz by Ibn Atiyyah
 Zad al-Masir fi Ilm al-Tafsir by Ibn al-Jawzi
 Al-Tafsir al-Kabir (also known as: Mafatih al-Ghayb) by Fakhr al-Din al-Razi
 Al-Taysir fi al-Tafsir by Abu Hafs Umar an-Nasafi
 Al-Jami' li-Ahkam al-Qur'an by Al-Qurtubi
 Tafsir al-Baydawi by Al-Baydawi
 Al-Bahr al-Muhit by Abu Hayyan al-Gharnati
 Tafsir ibn Kathir by Ibn Kathir
 Tafsir al-Jalalayn by Al-Mahalli and Al-Suyuti
 Dur al-Manthur by Al-Suyuti

Authentic Modern-age Tafsir 
 Al-Bahr al-Madid by Ahmad ibn Ajiba
 Ruh al-Ma'ani by Mahmud al-Alusi
 Bayan Ul Quran by Maulana Ashraf Ali Thanwi
 Maariful Quran by Mufti Muhammad Shafi
 Tafsir Tibyan-ul-Qur'an by Ghulam Rasool Saeedi
 Tafsir-ul-Qur’an (also known as: Tafsir-e-Majidi) by Maulana Abdul Majid Daryabadi
 Tafhim-ul-Quran by Syed Abul A'la Maududi
 Anwar Ul Bayan by Mufti Muhammad Ashiq Ilahi Bulandshahri
 A Thematic Commentary on the Qur'an by Muhammad al-Ghazali
 Zubdat al-itqān fī ‘ulūm al-Qur’ān by Muhammad 'Alawi al-Maliki
 The Meanings of the Noble Qur’an (with Explanatory Notes) by Mufti Muhammad Taqi Usmani

Aqidah (Theology)
 Al-Fiqh al-Akbar by Abu Hanifa (d. 150 AH)
 Al-Risala by Al-Shafi'i (d. 204 AH)
 Kitab al-Iman by Abu Bakr Ibn Abi Shaybah (d. 235 AH)
 Usul al-Sunnah by Ahmad Ibn Hanbal (d. 241 AH)
 Al-Radd 'ala al-Jahmiyyah wa al-Zanadaqah by Ahmad Ibn Hanbal (d. 241 AH)
 Nawadir al-Usul by Al-Hakim al-Tirmidhi (d. 255 AH)
 Khalq Afal al-Ibad by al-Bukhari (d. 256 AH)
 al-Ikhtilāf fī al-Lafz wa al-Radd ‘alā al-Jahmiyyah wal-Mushabbiha by Ibn Qutaybah (d. 276 AH)
 Kitab al-Sunnah by Harb Ibn Ismail al-Kirmani (d. 280 AH)
 Kitab al-Sunnah by Abdullah Ibn Ahmad Ibn Hanbal (d. 290 AH) 
 Kitab at-Tawheed by Ibn Khuzaymah (d. 311 AH)
 Al-Ha'iyah by Ibn Abi Dawud (d. 316 AH)
 Kitab al-Shariah by Abu Bakr al-Ajurri (d. 320 AH)
 Al-Aqidah al-Tahawiyyah by Al-Tahawi (d. 321 AH)
 Al-Maqālat al-Islamiyyīn by Abu al-Hasan al-Ash'ari (d. 324 AH)
 Al-Ibanah an Usul al-Diyanah by Al-Ash'ari
 Kitab al-Tawhid by Abu Mansur al-Maturidi (d. 333 AH)
 Al-Sawad al-A'zam by Al-Hakim al-Samarqandi (d. 342 AH)
 Kitab al-Thiqat by Ibn Hibban (d. 354 AH)
 Al-Sunnah by Al-Tabarani (d. 360 AH)
 Al-Shari'ah by Abu Bakr Al-Ajurri (d. 360 AH)
 Al-Mutalif wa al-Mukhtalif by Al-Daraqutni (d. 385 AH)
 Al-Risala al-Qayrawaniyya by Ibn Abi Zayd al-Qayrawani (d. 386 AH) 
 Al-Ibaanah by Ibn Battah (d. 387 AH)
 Al-Sunnah by Ibn Manda (d. 395 AH)
 Al-Iman by Ibn Manda (d. 395 AH)
 I'tiqad Ahl al-Sunnah wa al-Jama'ah by Abu al-Qasim Hibat Allah al-Lalakai (d. 418 AH)
 Al-Farq bayn al-Firaq by Abu Mansur Al-Baghdadi (d. 429 AH)
 Hilyat al-awliya by Abu Nu`aym (d. 430 AH)
 Al-Arba`in ala Madhhab al-Mutahaqqiqin min al-Sufiyya by Abu Nu`aym (d. 430 AH)
 Aqidah al-Salafi Ahl al-Hadith by Al-Sabuni (d. 449 AH)
 Al-Asma' wa al-Sifat by Al-Bayhaqi (d. 458 AH)
 Al-Durrah fi ma Yazibu Itiqaduhu by Ibn Hazm al-Andalusi
 Al-I'tqaad alaa Madhabis-Salaf Ahlus-Sunnah wal-Jamaah by Al-Bayhaqi (d. 458 AH)
 Hayat ul Anbiya fi Quboor by Al-Bayhaqi (d. 458 AH)
 Al-Ishara ila Madhhab Ahl al-Haqq by Abu Ishaq al-Shirazi 
 Kashf ul Mahjoob by Ali Hujwiri (d. 465 AH)
 Al-Irshad 'ila Qawati' al-Adilla fi Usul al-I'tiqad by Al-Juwayni (d. 478 AH)
 Al-Aqida al-Nizamiyya by Al-Juwayni (d. 478 AH)
 Ihya' Ulum al-Din by Al-Ghazali (d. 505 AH)
 Al-Iqtisad fi al-I'tiqad by Al-Ghazali (d. 505 AH)
 Iljam al-Awwam fi Ilm al-Kalam by Al-Ghazali (d. 505 AH) 
 Tabsirat al-Adilla by Abu al-Mu'in al-Nasafi (d. 508 AH)
 Talkhis al-Adilla li-Qawa'id al-Tawhid by Abu Ishaq al-Saffar al-Bukhari (d. 534/1139)
 Al-Aqaid al-Nasafiyya by Umar Ibn Muhammad al-Nasafi (d. 537 AH)
 Al-Milal wa al-Nihal by Al-Shahrastani (d. 548 AH)
 Tartib al-Madarik wa takrib al-Masalik by Qadi Ayyad (d. 554 AH)
 al-I`lam bi Hudud Qawa'id al-Islam by Qadi Ayyad (d. 554 AH)
 Daqa`iq al-akhbar fi dhikr al-janna wa-l-nar by Qadi Ayyad (d. 554 AH)
 Al-Ghunya li-Talibi Tariq al-Haqq by Shaykh Abdul Qadir Gilani (d. 561 AH)
 Al-Fath ar-Rabbani by Shaykh Abdul Qadir Gilani (d. 561 AH)
 Al-Baz al-Ashhab by Ibn al-Jawzi (d. 597 AH)
 Lum'ah al-I'tiqad by Ibn Qudama al-Maqdisi (d. 620 AH) 
 Al-Aqīdah Al-Wasitiyyah by Ibn Taymiyyah (d. 728 AH)
 Kitab al-Iman by Ibn Taymiyya (d. 728 AH)
 Nur al-Mubin by Ibn Jazayy al-Kalbi al-Gharnati al-Maliki
 Kitab ar-Ruh by Ibn Qayyim al-Jawziyya (d. 751 AH) 
 Sharh al-Aqaid al-Nasafiyya by al-Taftazani (d. 791 AH) 
 Sharh Al-Aqīdah At-Tahawiyyah by Ibn Abi al-Izz al-Hanafi (d. 792 AH)
 Al-Aqidah al-Sanusiyya by Al-Sanusi (d. 795 AH) 
 Kitab al-Tawhid by Ibn Rajab al-Hanbali (d. 795 AH)
 Sharh Fiqh al-Akbar by Mulla Ali Al-Qari al-Hanafi (d. 1014 AH) 
 Maktubat Imam Rabbani by Shaykh Ahmad Sirhindi (Mujaddid Alf-e-Saani) (d. 1034 AH)
 Akhbar al-Akhyar by Shaykh Abdul-Haqq Muhaddith Dehlavi (d. 1052 AH)
 Takmīl al-Iman by Shaykh Abdul-Haqq Muhaddith Dehlavi (d. 1052 AH)
 Hujjat Allah al-Baligha by Shah Waliullah Dehlawi (d. 1176 AH)
 Taqwiyatul Iman by Shah Ismail Dehlvi
 Al-Kharida al-Bahia by Ahmad al-Dardir (d. 1201 AH)
 Nayl al-Awtar by Al-Shawkani (d. 1250 AH)
 Risale-i Nur by Bediüzzaman Said Nursi (d. 1379 AH)

Fiqh (Jurisprudential Theory)

Hanafi
 Usul al-fiqh by Abu Yusuf (d. 182 AH)
 Ẓāhir al-Riwāyah of Abu Hanifa, Abu Yusuf and Muhammad al-Shaybani
 Uṣūl ash-Shashi by Nizham ad-Din ash-Shashi
 Al-Hidayah by Burhan al-Din al-Marghinani (d. 593 AH)
 Kanz ul-Daqaiq by Abu al-Barakat al-Nasafi (d. 710 AH)
 Multaqa al-Abḥur by Ibrāhīm al-Ḥalabī (d. 956 AH)
 Al-Bahr al-Raiq Sharh Kanz ul-Daqaiq by Ibn Nujaim al-Hanafi (d. 969 AH)
 Tuḥfat al-Mubtadī by Ibrāhīm bin Ḥasan al-Mullā al-Aḥsāʿī (d. 1048 AH)
 Fath Ar-Rahman Fi Isbat-e-Madhhab an-Nu'man by Abdul-Haqq Dehlavi (d. 1052 AH)
 Nur al-Idah by Abul-Ikhlāṣ Ḥasan ash-Shurunbulālī (d. 1069 AH)
 Marāqī as-Saʿādāt by Abul-Ikhlāṣ Ḥasan ash-Shurunbulālī
 Durr ul-Mukhtar by  Muhammad Ala ad-Din Haskafi (d. 1088 AH)
 Radd al-Muhtar ala al-Dur al-Mukhtar by Ibn Abidin (d. 1252 AH)
 Iṣlāḥ ʿIlm al-Ḥāl by Amīn Jundī
 Majallah al-Aḥkām al-ʿAdlīyah
 Hukuki İslamiye ve Istılahı Fıkhiyye Kamus by Ömer Nasuhi Bilmen

Compilation of Fatwa (Edicts)
 Fatawa Aziz by Shah Abdul Aziz Dehlavi
 Fatawa-e-Alamgiri commissioned by the Mughal Emperor Aurangzeb
 Fatawa-e-Razvia by Ahmed Raza Khan Barelvi

Shafi'i
 Kitab al-Umm by ash-Shafi'i
 Mukhtaṣar al-Muzanī by Al-Muzani
 Mukhtaṣar al-Buwayṭi by Al-Buwayti
 Al-Ikhtiyarat al-Fiqhiya by Al-Khattabi
 Al-Mabsūṭ by Al-Bayhaqi
 Al-Tanbih fi al-Fiqh al-Shafi'i by Abu Ishaq al-Shirazi
 Al-Muhadhdhab fi Fiqh al-Imam al-Shafi'i by Abu Ishaq al-Shirazi
 Al-Luma' fi Usul al-Fiqh by Abu Ishaq al-Shirazi 
 Nihayat al-Matlab fi Dirayat al-Madhhab by Al-Juwayni
 Al-Burhan Fi Usul al-Fiqh by Al Juwayni 
 Al-wajiz fi fiqh al-imam al-shafi’i by Al-Ghazali
 Al-mustasfa min 'ilm al-usul by Al-Ghazali
 Al Muntakhab Mina al-Mahsul fi Usul-al-Fiqh by Fakhr al-Din al-Razi
 Al-Ghayah fi Ikhtisar al-Nihayah by Izz al-Din ibn 'Abd al-Salam
 Al Qawa'id al-Kubra by Izz al-Din ibn 'Abd al-Salam
 Al-Maqāṣid by Al-Nawawi
 Minhāj aṭ-Ṭalibīn by Al-Nawawi
 Tabaqat ash-Shafi'iyah by Taj al-Din al-Subki
 Tashih al-Minhaj by Siraj al-Din al-Bulqini
 Umdat ul-Muhtaj ila Sharh al-Minhaj by Ibn al-Mulaqqin
 Kanz al-Raghibin by Al-Mahalli
 Al-Ashbaahu Wan-Nadhaair by Al-Suyuti
 Tuhfah AL-Muhtaj Bi Sharh Al-Minhaj by Ibn Hajar al-Haytami
 Al-Manhaj al-Qawim bi Sharh Masa-il at-Ta'lim by Ibn Hajar al-Haytami
 Umdat al-Salik wa Uddat al-Nasik by Ahmad ibn Naqib al-Misri
 Fatḥ al-Muʿīn by Zayn ad-Din Ahmed al-Malibari

Maliki
 Al Mudawanna by Sahnun
 Al Risalah by Ibn Abi Zayd Al-Qayrawani
 Works of Ibn 'Abd al-Barr
 Works of Qadi Ayyad
 Bidayat al-Mujtahid wa Nihayat al-Muqtaṣid by Ibn Rushd
 Works of Shihab al-Din al-Qarafi
 Al-Madkhal by Ibn al-Hajj al-Abdari
 Mukhtasar by Khalil ibn Ishaq al-Jundi
 Al-Muwafaqaat fi Usool al-Sharia by Al-Shatibi

Hanbali
 Masāʾil of Ahmad ibn Hanbal (d. 241 AH)
 Wadih fi Uṣūl al-Fiqh by Ibn Aqil (d. 513 AH)
 Futūh al-Ghayb by Abdul-Qadir Gilani (d. 561 AH)
 Muthīr al-Gharām al-Sākin ilā Ashraf al-Amākin by Ibn al-Jawzi (d. 597 AH)
 ʿUmdat al-Fiqh by Ibn Qudamah (d. 620 AH)
 al-Muqniʿ by Ibn Qudamah
 Al-Mughnī by Ibn Qudamah
 Al-Kaafi by Ibn Qudamah
 Kitab al-Furu by Ibn Muflih (d. 763 AH)
 Zād al-Mustaqniʿ by Al-Hajjawi (d. 968 AH)
 Dalīl al-Ṭālib by Marʿī bin Yūsuf al-Karmī (d. 1033 AH)
 Muntahā al-Irādāt by al-Bahūtī (d. 1051 AH)
 ʿUmdat al-Ṭālib by al-Bahūtī
 Kashshāf al-Qināʿ by al-Bahūtī
 Akhṣar al-Mukhtaṣarāt by Ibn Balban (d. 1083 AH)
 Bidāyat al-ʿĀbid by ʿAbd ar-Raḥmān al-Ba’lī (d. 1110 AH)
 Al-Ajwibat al-Jaliyyah by Mūsā al-Qaddumi (d. 1265 AH)

Seerah (Prophetic biography Sallallahu 'alaihi Wa Salam)
{{see also|List of biographies of the Noble Prophet Muhammad} Sallallahu 'alaihi Wa Salam}
 Sīrat Rasūl Allāh Sallalahu 'alaihi Wa Salam by Ibn Ishaq
 Al-Sirah Al-Nabawiyyah by Ibn Hisham
 Ash-Shifa by Qadi Ayyad
 Al-Rawḍ al-unuf by Al-Suhayli (a commentary of Al-Sirah Al-Nabawiyyah)
 Al-Wafa bi Ahwal al-Mustafa Sallallahu 'alaihi Wa Salam by Ibn al-Jawzi
 Zad al-Ma'ad by Ibn Qayyim Al-Jawziyya
 Al-Sīrah al-Nabawīyyah Sallallahu 'alaihi Wa Salam (4 Volume Set) by Ibn Kathir
 Al-Khasa'is al-Kubra by Al-Suyuti
 Al-Muwahib al-Ladunniyyah by Al-Qastallani
 Al-Naimat-ul-Kubra Ala al-Alam by Ibn Hajar al-Haytami
 Sharh al-Shifa by Ali al-Qari (a commentary of Ash-Shifa Sallallahu 'alaihi Wa Salam)
 Madarij an-Nabuwwat by  'Abd al-Haqq al-Dehlawi
 Seerat E Rasool Sallallahu 'alaihi Wa Salam by Shah Waliullah Dehlawi
 Seeratul Mustafa Sallallahu 'alaihi Wa Salam by Muhammad Idris Kandhlawi
 Ar-Raheeq Al-Makhtum by Safiur Rahman Mubarakpuri

Proofs of Prophethood
 Dala'il al-Nubuwwah by Al-Bayhaqi

Shama'il
 Al-Shama'il al-Muhammadiyya by Al-Tirmidhi

History
 Jamharah Ansāb al-ʿArab by Hisham ibn al-Kalbi (d.819 AD)
 Book of Idols by Hisham ibn al-Kalbi (d.819 AD)
 Kitāb aṭ-Tabaqāt al-Kabīr by Ibn Sa'd (d.845 AD)
 Kitab Ma'rifat al-Sahaba by Al-Madini (d.849 AD)
 Kitab al-Fada'il Sahaba by Ahmad ibn Hanbal (d.855 AD)
 The Great History by Muhammad al-Bukhari (d.870 AD)
 Al-Imama wa al-Siyasa by Ibn Qutaybah (d.889 AD)
 Fath al-Buldan by Ahmad ibn Yahya al-Baladhuri (d.892 AD)
 Genealogies of the Nobles (book) by Ahmad Ibn Yahya al-Baladhuri (d.892 AD)
 Tarikh at-Tabari by Muhammad ibn Jarir al-Tabari (d.923 AD)
 Tarikh E Masoodi by Al-Masudi (d.956 AD)
 Works of Ahmad ibn Fadlan (d.960 AD)
 Al-Kāmil fi Ḍuʿafāʾ ar-Rijāl by Ibn 'Adi al-Jurjani (d.976 AD)
 History of Nishapur by Al-Hakim al-Nishapuri (d.1014 AD)
 Hilyat al-Awliya by Abu Nu'aym al-Isfahani (d.1038 AD)
 Tabaqat al-Hanabilah by Al-Qadi Abu Ya'la (d.1066 AD) and Ibn Rajab al-Hanbali (d.1393 AD)
 History of Baghdad by Al-Khatib al-Baghdadi (d.1071 AD)
 Al-Istiʿāb by Ibn Abd-al-Barr (d.1071 AD)
 History of Damascus by Ibn `Asakir (d.1176 AD)
 Al-Kamal fi Asma' al-Rijal by Abd al-Ghani al-Maqdisi (d.1203 AD)
 Chach Nama by Kazi Ismail al-Thakafi & Ali bin Ḥamid Kufi (written in 1226 AD)
 Mu'jam Al-Buldan by Yaqut al-Hamawi (d.1229 AD)
 The Complete History by Ali ibn al-Athir (d.1233 AD)
 Usd al-ghabah fi marifat al-Saḥabah by Ali ibn al-Athir (d.1233 AD)
 Tabaqat-i Nasiri by Minhaj-i-Siraj (written in 1260 AD)
 Deaths of Eminent Men and the Sons of the Epoch by Ibn Khallikan (d.1282 AD)
 Ar Riyadh un Nadhra by Muhibuddin Tabri (d.1295 AD)
 Minah al-madh by Fatḥ al-Din Ibn Sayyid al-Nās (d.1334 AD)
 Mizan al-Itidal by al-Dhahabi (d.1348 AD)
 al-Bidayah wan-Nihayah by Ibn Kathir (d.1373 AD)
 Qisas Al-Anbiya by Ibn Kathir (d.1373 AD)
 Muqaddimah by Ibn Khaldun (d.1406 AD)
 Tahdhib al-Tahdhib by Ibn Hajar al-'Asqalani (d.1449 AD)
 History of the Caliphs by Al-Suyuti (d.1505 AD)
 Wafa al-Wafa by Ali ibn Ahmad al-Samhudi (d.1533 AD)
 Habib al-Siyar by Ghiyās̲ ad-Dīn Khvāndamīr (d. 1534-37 AD)
 Tarikh Khamis by Husayn ibn Muhammad Diyarbakri (d.1559 AD)
 Tarikh-i Firishta by Muhammad Qasim Firishta (d.1620 AD)
 Sirat al-Halbiya by Ali Ibn Burhan-ud-din Halbi (d.1635 AD)
 Tariqh-e Haqqi by Abdul-Haqq Dehlavi (d.1642 AD)
 Al Insaf fi Bayan Asbab Al Iktikaaf by Shah Waliullah Dehlawi (d.1762 AD)
 Sirush Shahadhathayn by Shah Abdul Aziz Dehlavi (d.1824 AD)

Biographies
 Hilyat al-awliya by Abu Nu`aym (d. 430 AH)
 Ṣifat al-Ṣafwah by Ibn al-Jawzi (d. 597 AH)
  by Al-Dhahabi (d.748 AH)

Tazkiyyah (Purification of Heart)

Basics
 Risalah al-Mustarshidin (Treatise for the Seekers of Guidance) by Harith al-Muhasibi (d. 243 AH)

Spiritual Diseases and their Cures
 ʿUyūb al-nafs wa adwiyātuhā (Infamies of The Soul And Their Treatments) by Abū ʿAbd al-Raḥmān Muḥammad al-Sulamī al-Nīshāpūri (d. 412 AH)
 Ṭibb al-Rūḥāni by Ibn al-Jawzi (d. 597 AH)
 Tanbih al-Mughtarin by Al-Sha'rani (d. 973 AH)
 Maṭharat al-Qulūb by Muḥammad al-Mawlūd (d. 1323 AH)

Dhikr
 Al-Da'awat al-Kabir by Al-Bayhaqi
 Hizb al-Bahr by Abul Hasan ash-Shadhili
 Kitab al-Adhkar by Al-Nawawi
 Al-Wabil al-Sayyib by Ibn Qayyim Al-Jawziyya
 Dala'il al-Khayrat by Muhammad al-Jazuli
 Al-Hizb ul-Azam by Ali al-Qari

Adab (Manners)
 Al-Adab al-Mufrad of Muhammad al-Bukhari (d. 256 AH)
 Al-Akhlāq wa al-Siyar by Ibn Hazm (d. 456 AH)
 Fuṣul al-Adab wa Makarim al-Akhlaq al-Mashruʿah by Ibn Aqil (d. 513 AH)

Zuhd (Asceticism)
 Kitab az-Zuhd wa al-Raqa'iq by Ibn al-Mubarak (d. 189 AH)
 Kitab al-Zuhd by Ahmad ibn Hanbal
 Al-Zuhd al-Kabir by Al-Bayhaqi

Sufism
  al-Arba'in fi 'l-tasawwuf by Abū ʿAbd al-Raḥmān Muḥammad al-Sulamī al-Nīshāpūri
 Qut al-qulub (Sustenance of the Hearts) by Abu Talib al-Makki (d. 386 AH)
 Al-Arba`in ala Madhhab al-Mutahaqqiqin min al-Sufiyya by Abu Nu`aym (d. 430 AH)
 Al-Risala al-Qushayriyya by  Abu al-Qasim al-Qushayri (d. 465 AH)
 Kashf ul Mahjoob by Ali Hujwiri (d. 465 AH)
 Maktubat Imam Rabbani by Mujaddid Alf-e-Saani Ahmad Sirhindi (d. 1034 AH)

Islamic Ethics and Philosophy
 Hayat ul Anbiya fi Quboor by Al-Bayhaqi (d. 458 AH)
 Ihya Ulum al-Din by Al-Ghazali (d. 505 AH)
 Kimiya-yi sa'ādat by Al-Ghazali (d. 505 AH)
 Al-Fath ar-Rabbani by Shaykh Abdul-Qadir Gilani (d. 561 AH)
 Al-Futūḥāt al-Makkiyya by Ibn Arabi (d. 638 AH)

Islamic Economics

 The Economic System In Islam by Taqiuddin al-Nabhani
 An Introduction to Islamic Finance by Muhammad Taqi Usmani
 Our Socio-Economic Order by Muhammad Taqi Usmani
 Present Financial Crisis Causes & Remedies by Muhammad Taqi Usmani
 The Historic Judgment on Interest by Muhammad Taqi Usmani

Islamic Politics

 Kitab al-Kharaj by Imam Abu Yusuf
 Zakhirat al-Muluk by Mir Sayyid Ali Hamadani
 Khilafat o Malukiyat by Abul Ala Maududi

Poetry

Qasida (Ode)
 
diwan-al Hassan by hassan Ibn Sabit

Qasidat al-Burdah by Imam al-Busiri

Hadaiq-e-Bakhshish by Ahmed Raza Khan Barelvi

Khushbu e Adeeb by Adeeb Raipuri

Critique

Qadiyaniat
 Saife Chishtiyai by Meher Ali Shah
 Signs of Qiyamah and the Arrival of Maseeh by Muhammad Shafi
 Finality of the Prophethood by Muhammad Shafi
 Mirza And Yalesh by Fuad Al-Attar

Shi'a
 Al-Awasim min al-Qawasim by Abu Bakr ibn al-Arabi
 Al-Sawa'iq al-Muhriqah by Ibn Hajar al-Haytami
 Taufa Ithna Ashari by Shah Abdul Aziz Dehlavi

Others

 Kitab al-Miraj by Abu'l-Qasim al-Nisapuri (alleged); A Muslim book concerned with Muhammad's ascension into Heavens (known as the Miraj).

See also

List of Islamic texts
List of Muslim educational institutions
List of Shia books

References

 
Islam-related lists
Lists of books about religion